Pozdeyevka is a rural locality (a selo) in Pozdeyevsky Selsoviet of Romnensky District, Amur Oblast, Russia. The population was 1,544 as of 2018. There are  17 streets.

Geography 
Pozdeyevka is located 39 km southwest of Romny (the district's administrative centre) by road. Verkhnebeloye is the nearest rural locality.

References 

Rural localities in Romnensky District